Siri A. Meling (born 8 February 1963 in Stavanger) is a Norwegian politician for the Conservative Party.

She was elected to the Norwegian Parliament from Rogaland in 2001, but was not re-elected in 2005. She served in the position of deputy representative during the term 2005–2009.

She took her education at the BI Norwegian Business School, and then worked as a businesswoman based in Egersund. Since 2006 she is a sub-director in the Norwegian Directorate of Fisheries.

References

1963 births
Living people
Members of the Storting
Conservative Party (Norway) politicians
Rogaland politicians
BI Norwegian Business School alumni
Norwegian Christians
21st-century Norwegian politicians